The Italian Cultural Institute, London is based at 39 Belgrave Square in Belgravia, London. The institute promotes Italian culture and organises events at its own premises including exhibitions, concerts and meetings. It also supports the learning of Italian language through the set-up of group lessons. It deals with many activities elsewhere in UK. There are a library, an internal café and other facilities available for those who are involved in its activities. Various types of membership are available for individuals and organisations.

References

External links 
 Italian Cultural Institute website

Italian culture
Culture in London
Cultural and educational buildings in London
Cultural organisations based in London
Cultural promotion organizations